"Sweaters for Penguins" is a song written by James Gordon for the CBC Radio program Basic Black.  It describes a true incident, in which penguin sweaters were requested to help rehabilitate little penguins injured by oil spills in Tasmania.

Discography
  James Gordon's Tune Cooties
  Cathy Miller's A Quilter's World

References

James Gordon (Canadian musician) songs